Te-Hani Rose Alexandra Brown (born 16 March 1996) is a Cook Islands politician and member of the Cook Islands Parliament. She is an independent.

Career
Te-Hani Brown was born in 1996 in Rarotonga, Cook Islands. Brown is the daughter of MP Rose Toki-Brown. She was first elected to parliament as a candidate for the Cook Islands Democratic Party in the 2018 election, defeating Nandi Glassie. At age 22, she was the youngest MP in the Pacific region.

In January 2019 Brown resigned from the Democratic party to support the government of Henry Puna. Anti-party hopping laws forced her to resign from parliament. She contested the subsequent by-election as an independent, and was re-elected, but resigned the seat again just two weeks later when an electoral petition was filed. She contested a second by-election in November 2019 and was re-elected for a third time.

Following the election of Mark Brown as Prime Minister she was appointed Associate Minister of Internal Affairs and Health.

She was re-elected at the 2022 Cook Islands general election and continued her support for Mark Brown.

References

1996 births
Living people
People from Rarotonga
Members of the Parliament of the Cook Islands
Democratic Party (Cook Islands) politicians
Cook Island women in politics
21st-century New Zealand women politicians
21st-century New Zealand politicians